Rodel Tapaya (born 1980) is a Filipino painter.

Biography
Rodel Tapaya was born in 1980, in Montalban, Rizal, Philippines. He graduated from the University of the Philippines College of Fine Arts and Goldsmiths. In 2011, he won the Signature Art Prize given by the Asia-Pacific Breweries Foundation and the Singapore Art Museum.

Work

Tapaya's works recurrently depict narratives embedded in Filipino cultural history. His current works are marked by labyrinthine patterns and recurring characters that transmit scenes and figures from folk stories in his pictorial world. He studied Painting and Drawing at the Parsons School of Design and the University of Art and Design in Helsinki, Finland.

Notes

External links

 Official Website of Rodel Tapaya

 Auction Results of Rodel Tapaya

Filipino painters
University of the Philippines alumni
People from Rodriguez, Rizal
Artists from Rizal
1980 births
Living people
Filipino contemporary artists
University of Helsinki alumni